"Lights, Camera, Action!" is the debut single by Mr. Cheeks, from his debut album John P. Kelly. The song was released in August 2001 and produced by Bink, who used a sample of "Keep on Truckin'" by Eddie Kendricks. The song became Mr. Cheeks' first and only major hit as a solo artist, reaching No. 14 on the Billboard Hot 100 and topping the R&B charts for one week.

The official remix featured Missy Elliott, P. Diddy and Petey Pablo, this version appeared on the XXX soundtrack.

Single track listing
"Lights, Camera, Action!" (LP Version)- 4:28
"Lights, Camera, Action!" (Remix)- 4:06
"Lights, Camera, Action!" (Radio Edit)- 3:44
"Lights, Camera, Action!" (Explicit)- 3:44
"Lights, Camera, Action!" (Instrumental)- 4:03

Charts

Peak positions

Year-End Charts

References

2001 debut singles
2001 songs
Songs written by Mr. Cheeks
Universal Records singles